Master Kong is the largest instant noodle producer in China.

Master Kong may also refer to:

 Master Kong Chef's Table, a restaurant chain operated by the food company
 Master Kong (restaurant), Portland, Oregon, U.S.
 Confucius, the latinization of the Chinese name Kongfuzi for which the literal meaning is "Master Kong"